Allium borszczowii is a plant species native to Uzbekistan, Kazakhstan, Turkmenistan, Iran, Afghanistan and Pakistan. It is about 30 cm tall with white and purplish flowers.

References

borszczowii
Onions
Flora of Pakistan
Flora of Uzbekistan
Flora of Turkmenistan
Flora of Kazakhstan
Flora of Iran
Flora of Afghanistan
Plants described in 1875